Dapitan, officially the City of Dapitan (Subanon: Gembagel G'benwa Dapitan/Bagbenwa Dapitan ), is a 3rd class component city in the province of Zamboanga del Norte, Philippines. According to the 2020 census, it has a population of 85,202 people.

It is historically significant as the place where José Rizal was exiled by the Spanish colonial authorities for his threat to start revolutionary activities. He is considered a national hero, and this is known as the "Shrine City in the Philippines." It is also often considered the capital of Mindanao Island. The city is also home to Gloria's Fantasyland, the first amusement park in Mindanao.

History 
The earliest settlers of Dapitan were the Subanens, a nomadic tribe of Austronesian stock known to have settled and lived along the banks of the river or “suba” out of which their present-day tribal identity originated.

Early cartographers of the Philippines showed Dapitan's location on their maps of Mindanao in varying names, such as "Dapito"  in Kaerius' map of 1598, "Dapite" in Dudley's map of 1646, "Dapyto" in Sanson's map of 1652, and "Dapitan" in Moll's map of East Indies 1729 and in Murillo Velarde's map of 1734.

Dapitan was already a thriving settlement when Miguel López de Legazpi arrived in 1595.  It is believed that some Augustinian friars accompanied Legazpi's expedition, who converted the natives to Christianity. Foremost of the converts were Pedro Manooc, son of Pagbuaya, and Manooc's daughter, Maria Uray. A permanent mission was founded at Dapitan in 1629 headed by a Jesuit missionary, Father Pedro Gutierrez.

It was only after the establishment of the Jesuit mission that a strong and stable form of government was finally established. The Spanish authorities adopted the local form of government that was already existing but placed the officials under the absolute control of the Spanish government. The settlement came to be known as the "pueblo", and its head variously called either "Datu", "Capitan" or "Cabeza de Barangay". The politico-military commandancia of Dapitan until the end of the Spanish domination in 1898 was still dependent on Misamis. It was only during the revolutionary period that Dapitan became an integral part of the Filipino forces in Zamboanga.

Cityhood

On June 22, 1963, President Diosdado Macapagal signed R.A. 3811 which converted Dapitan into a chartered city. It is officially renowned as the “Shrine City of the Philippines.”

Geography
Dapitan is situated at the mouth of the Dapitan River on Dapitan Bay, and is the northernmost point of the Zamboanga Peninsula.

Climate

Barangays
Dapitan is politically subdivided into 50 barangays, of which 8 barangays are urban, 27 are interior, 13 are coastal, and 2 are island barangays. In 1955, the sitios of Sipalok, Barcelona, and Potungan were converted into barrios.

Taguilon

Taguilon is home to the Dakak Park and Beach Resort. It is a producer of coconut and agar (based on sea weed) as well as a fishing port.  The pier in Taguilon is a secondary/alternate port to the main passenger/cargo port in Dapitan.  Additionally, during severe storms at sea, ferries and other ships find shelter in the Taguilon cove.  One can find the mount Lalab overlooking the islets of Silinog and part of Balyangaw.

Talisay
Talisay is a seaside barangay where José Rizal spent four years in exile. A park and shrine honoring the Philippine national hero can be found in the José Rizal Memorial Protected Landscape, a protected area declared in 2000, located in the old Rizal farm site in the barangay.

Demographics

Economy

Government

Dapitan's seat of government, the City Hall, is located at the Dapitan Government Center in Barangay Dawo. The local government structure is composed of one mayor, one vice mayor and ten councilors all elected through popular vote. Two ex officio members are added to the City Council with one representing Dapitan's 50 Barangay Captains being the Association of Barangay Councils (ABC) President, and one representing Dapitan's 50 Barangay Youth Council Presidents being the Sangguniang Kabataan (SK) Federation President. Each official, with the exemption of the ABC and SK Presidents, is elected publicly to a 3-year term and can be re-elected up to 3 terms in succession. The day-to-day administration of the city is handled by the city administrator.

Tourism

Liwasan ng Dapitan (Dapitan City Plaza) Dapitan City Plaza ("Liwasan ng Dapitan"), also known as the City Square, was beautified and developed by Dr. José Rizal during his exile. With the assistance of the Spanish Politico-Military Governor of Dapitan, Gov. Ricardo Carnicero, Rizal made the City Square comparable to those he saw in Europe. It has an area of one hectare, more or less.

 Punto del Desembarco de Rizal Rizal disembarked in Punto del Desembarco de Rizal (Rizal's Point of Disembarking). A 20-foot cross also stands in the place to symbolize the propagation of Christianity in the locality of Dapitan.

 Rizal Park and Shrine Rizal Park and Shrine is a major historical landmark in Dapitan. In August 1892, Rizal, together with Governor Carnicero and Francisco Equilor, a Spaniard living in Dipolog, won a lottery bet which financially enabled Dr. Rizal to buy a 10-hectare piece of land from Lucia Pagbangon. Rizal moved to the area in which the shrine currently stands in March 1893. Later on, his mother, Doña Teodora Alonso Realonda, his sisters, and some relatives from Calamba, Laguna, came and lived with him in Barangay Talisay (which is where the shrine is located) until 1896. Rizal Shrine was declared a national shrine through Presidential Decree No. 105 issued by then-President Ferdinand Marcos on January 24, 1973.

 Casa Real Rizal stayed in Casa Real with Governor Carnicero from his arrival until he moved to the present-day location of Rizal Shrine in Barangay Talisay in March 1893. The appearance of Casa Real is similar to that of the old city hall, with bamboo on each side and the upper portion made up of wood. A replica of Casa Real will soon rise near its marker.

 St. James the Greater Church This church was built in 1871 in honor of St. James the Greater, Dapitan's patron saint. The design of the interior walls is more or less one meter thick and still original except for the furnishing. The altar and the interior hane undergone several renovations. Inside is a historical spot where Rizal stood while hearing Mass every Sunday. At the mezzanine is the priceless heritage organ that bears the year wherein it was made – 1827 – at the choir loft. It was brought to Dapitan by the Augustinian Recollect fathers. A German-made instrument with European pipes, it is a manual pipe organ.

 Cotta de Dapitan Established in 1761, the fort was made to monitor the waters of northern Zamboanga. The fort was made on top of the sacred Ilihan Hill. Currently, the fort is in dire need of conservation.

Festivals 
Dapitan has launched a diversified fiesta celebration of its Patron St. James or Señor Santiago, whose memorial is celebrated every July 25, for the locals through a three-in-one affair, combining religious, cultural and sports events in its Kinabayo Festival.

The Kinabayo Festival kicks off July 16 and culminates on July 31 with various events taking place within the Shrine City of the Philippines.

Transportation

Sea

Dapitan is served by the Port of Pulauan in barangay San Vicente (albeit ferry schedules often list the destination as Port of Dipolog, a neighboring city). There are daily ferries from/to Dumaguete and from/to Cebu City.

Air
Dapitan is catered by Dipolog Airport through Philippine Airlines, and Cebu Pacific. From Dipolog take a shuttle bus to Dapitan which is 20–30 minutes ride, that's 12 kilometers from the airport to the City proper of Dapitan.

Notable personalities

José Rizal (b. 1861 - d. 1896) - national hero
Martha Cecilia (b. 1953 - d. 2014) - Filipino writer of Tagalog romance pocketbook novels
Gazini Ganados (b. 1995) - Filipino fashion model and beauty pageant titleholder who became Binibining Pilipinas 2019 Universe and part of Top 20 of Miss Universe 2019.
Theodore Boborol (b. 1979) - A renowned film and television director in the Philippines.

Sister cities

Local
 Zamboanga City, Philippines
 Dipolog, Philippines
 Davao City, Philippines

International
 Litoměřice, Czech Republic

References

External links

 Official website
 [ Philippine Standard Geographic Code]

 
Cities in Zamboanga del Norte
Populated places established in 1629
1629 establishments in the Philippines
Component cities in the Philippines